Bjørn Skaare (29 October 1958 – 21 June 1989) was a Norwegian ice hockey player. He was the first Norwegian to play in the NHL, playing a single game with the Detroit Red Wings during the 1978–79 NHL season.

Playing career
Skaare's talent was evident at an early age. He made his debut for Furuset before he had turned 16. In 1976, he was signed by Färjestad of the Swedish Elitserien, although he returned to Furuset within a year. In the fall of 1977, Skaare moved to Canada, where he was signed by the Ottawa 67's of the Ontario Hockey League, where he became a teammate of future NHL star Bobby Smith. Skaare scored 12 goals and had 30 assists for Ottawa, and was drafted in the 4th round (62nd pick overall) of the 1978 NHL Entry Draft by the Detroit Red Wings.

Skaare was assigned to the Kansas City Red Wings of the Central Hockey League. After an impressive play for Kansas City, he was called up to Detroit. He made his NHL debut against the Colorado Rockies on November 29, 1978. However, this would also be Skaare's only appearance in the NHL. He picked up an injury when he was checked by Barry Beck, and was later sent back to Kansas City. Skaare had 8 goals and 26 assists in 37 games for Kansas City, but decided to move back to Norway in February 1979.

Back in Norway, Skaare helped Furuset win the Norwegian championship in 1981 and 1983. He was named player of the year in 1981, earning him the Golden Puck. In 1981–82, he played for Klagenfurt of the Austrian hockey league, and was named the league's best player. However, Skaare was homesick, and once again moved back to Furuset.

In 1984, he briefly returned to North America, playing for the Tulsa Oilers of the Central Hockey League, but once again returned home within a few months. He was a member of the Tulsa Oilers (CHL) team that suspended operations on February 16, 1984, playing only road games for the final six weeks of the 1983–84 season. Despite this adversity, the team went on to win the league's championship. Skaare played in all nine playoff games, scoring nine points to help his team win the Adams Cup.

On the night of 21 June 1989, Skaare was killed in a car accident. He was driving from Norrköping in Sweden towards Oslo. He lost control of the car between Karlskoga and Kristinehamn.

Championships
He won the 1983–84 CHL Championship (Adams Cup) as a member of the Tulsa Oilers  team coached by Tom Webster.

His number 7 jersey has been retired by Furuset Ishockey.

Career statistics

Regular season and playoffs

International

See also
List of players who played only one game in the NHL
List of ice hockey players who died during their playing career

References

External links
 Bjørn Skaare memorial site (in Norwegian)
 
 Norwegian NHL records
 Norwegian born players drafted by NHL teams

1958 births
1989 deaths
Detroit Red Wings draft picks
Detroit Red Wings players
Färjestad BK players
Furuset Ishockey players
Ice hockey players at the 1984 Winter Olympics
Kansas City Red Wings players
EC KAC players
NIHF Golden Puck winners
Norwegian expatriate ice hockey people
Norwegian expatriate sportspeople in Canada
Norwegian expatriate sportspeople in the United States
Norwegian ice hockey centres
Olympic ice hockey players of Norway
Ottawa 67's players
Road incident deaths in Sweden
Ice hockey people from Oslo
Tulsa Oilers (1964–1984) players